Tarik Makarem (born 18 January 1982), is an English actor most famous for playing Nikhil Sharma in Emmerdale.

Classically trained he is a graduate of the Royal Scottish Academy of Music & Drama. He won a Laurence Olivier Bursary in 2004 in association with the Society of London Theatre.

Television
Makarem is best known for head lead series regular role, Nikhil Sharma in Emmerdale for ITV, playing across both dramatic and comedic storylines.

His first appearance was on 11 September 2009. In May 2013, Makarem announced he was leaving the programme, his final episode was on 20 August 2013 when his character left the village for a new life in Toronto shortly after his wife, Genesis Walker was murdered.

In September 2015, after devoting his energy to theatre roles, Makarem confirmed that he was reprising his role as Nikhil in a "powerful" storyline. His character Nikhil returned on 29 October 2015 and departed on 19 February 2016.

On 1 September 2016, Makarem confirmed that he was joining BBC1's Casualty in a lead role, Dr Sebastian Grayling playing into 2017. 

Makarem had a starring role, as guest lead in BBC's global smash hit Torchwood: Children of Earth alongside John Barrowman. He has also featured in an episode of ITV's period drama Foyle's War. Other notable television credits include Consent for Channel 4 starring with Michelle Dockery and Daniel Mays, and ITV comedy FM.

He has also appeared with his family in an episode of All Star Family Fortunes which was first aired in March 2012.

Film

Makarem starred alongside Andrew Scott, Tobias Menzies and Fiona Glascott in the period feature film The Duel.

Theatre 

In November 2013, he starred in the lead role of Toby, opposite James Cartwright in Martin Sherman's Passing By. The production received much critical acclaim for Makarem's and his co-stars performance.

From January to April 2014 Makarem co-starred with David Essex, Andrew Jarvis and Jared Garfield in a touring production of Morris Panych's The Dishwashers. Makarem again, received great reviews alongside his esteemed colleague. What's On Stage went on to say "Makarem beautifully complements his cast mates as he provides a new and different approach to the existential crisis that appears throughout the play."

From January to July 2015 Makarem co-starred with Tina Hobley and Michael McKell, in a nationwide theatre tour and international premiere of Peter James's  Dead Simple. Makarem was noted by critics for being "particularly strong"  and describing him to "Stun the audience with his role"

Music

Alongside his acting career, Makarem is an established songwriter.

Other
He was part of Team Emmerdale who in August 2011 completed an Extreme Cycle Challenge, cycling 224 miles in less than 24 hours, from the set of Emmerdale to the set of EastEnders, in aid of Macmillan Cancer Support.

He has also taken part in the Great Manchester Cycle and Ride London as part of the LLRunstoppable team which supports Bloodwise.

Filmography

Films

TV

Awards and nominations

References

External links
Official Website

1982 births
People from Chesterfield, Derbyshire
English people of Lebanese descent
Alumni of the Royal Conservatoire of Scotland
English male soap opera actors
English male stage actors
English male film actors
Living people